Methylocystis hirsuta is a Gram-negative, aerobic and methanotroph bacterium species from the genus of Methylocystis which has been isolated from a groundwater aquifer from Mountain View in California in the United States.

References

Further reading

External links
Type strain of Methylocystis hirsuta at BacDive -  the Bacterial Diversity Metadatabase

Methylocystaceae
Bacteria described in 2007